Tanja Erath (born 7 October 1989) is a German professional racing cyclist, who currently rides for UCI Women's Continental Team .

Major results

2018
 2nd Scratch, National Track Championships
 4th Open de Suède Vårgårda TTT
2019
 1st  Team pursuit, National Track Championships
 1st  Sprints classification Emakumeen Euskal Bira
 5th Overall BeNe Ladies Tour
 5th Time trial, National Road Championships
 6th Tour of Guangxi
2020
 3rd Road race, National Road Championships
 3rd La Périgord Ladies
2021
 2nd  Mixed team relay, European Road Championships

References

External links
 

1989 births
Living people
German female cyclists
Sportspeople from Heilbronn
Cyclists from Baden-Württemberg
20th-century German women
21st-century German women